Elachista brevis is a moth of the family Elachistidae that is endemic to  Kenya.

The wingspan is about 7.3 mm. The ground colour of the forewings is whitish, mottled with ochreous or greyish at the tips of the scales. Brownish black-tipped scales form two small spots and the fringe is greyish. The hindwings are grey.

Etymology
The species name refers to the short distal spine of the sacculus and is derived from Latin brevis (meaning short).

References

brevis
Moths described in 2009
Endemic moths of Kenya
Moths of Africa